Tettigoniidea is an infraorder of the order Orthoptera, with six extant families.

Families
The Orthoptera Species File lists:
superfamily Hagloidea Handlirsch, 1906
 †Eospilopteronidae Cockerell, 1916
 †Haglidae Handlirsch, 1906
 †Hagloedischiidae Gorochov, 1986
 †Prezottophlebiidae Martins-Neto, 2007
 Prophalangopsidae Kirby, 1906 (grigs)
 †Tuphellidae Gorochov, 1988
 †Tzetzenulia Gorochov, 1990
 superfamily †Phasmomimoidea Sharov, 1968
 †Phasmomimidae Sharov, 1968
 superfamily Stenopelmatoidea Burmeister, 1838 (wetas & king crickets)
 Anostostomatidae Saussure, 1859
 Cooloolidae Rentz, 1980
 Gryllacrididae Blanchard, 1845
 Stenopelmatidae Burmeister, 1838
 superfamily Tettigonioidea Krauss, 1902 (bush crickets or katydids)
 †Haglotettigoniidae Gorochov, 1988
 †Permotettigoniidae Nel & Garrouste, 2016
 Tettigoniidae Krauss, 1902
Incertae sedis
 †Tettoraptor maculatus Gorochov, 2012

References

Further reading

 
 Capinera J.L, Scott R.D., Walker T.J. (2004). Field Guide to Grasshoppers, Katydids, and Crickets of the United States. Cornell University Press.

External links
 
 NCBI Taxonomy Browser, Tettigoniidea

Ensifera